Robert Eden Duncombe Shafto (23 March 1776 – 17 January 1848) of Whitworth Hall, Spennymoor, County Durham, was a British politician.  He was Member of Parliament (MP) for the City of Durham from 1804 to 1806. He served as High Sheriff of Durham in 1842.

Sources

1776 births
1848 deaths
People from Spennymoor
Members of the Parliament of Great Britain for City of Durham
UK MPs 1802–1806
High Sheriffs of Durham